This is a list of notable Jewish American visual artists.  For other Jewish Americans, see List of Jewish Americans.

 Vincent Glinsky, sculptor
 Joseph Goldyne, draftsman, printmaker
 Sylvia Hyman, ceramist 
 Alex Katz, painter
 Nathaniel Kaz, sculptor
 Ibram Lassaw, sculptor
 Lionel S. Reiss, painter, creator of MGM's "Leo the Lion"
 Nell Sinton, painter
 Israel Tsvaygenbaum, painter
 Max Weber, cubist painter

See also 
 :Category:Jewish American artists

References

.01
Jewish American
Visual artists
Jewish American